This Was is the debut studio album by the British rock band Jethro Tull, released in October 1968. Recorded at a cost of £1200, it is the only Jethro Tull album with guitarist Mick Abrahams, who was a major influence for the sound and music style of the band's first songs. When the album was released the band was already performing at the Marquee Club in London, where other successful British groups, such as the Rolling Stones and the Who, had started their careers.

Music
While vocalist Ian Anderson's creative vision largely shaped Jethro Tull's later albums, on This Was Anderson shared songwriting duties with Tull's guitarist Mick Abrahams. In part due to Abrahams' influence, the album incorporates more rhythm and blues and jazz influences than the progressive rock the band later became known for. In particular:

This Was also contains the only Jethro Tull lead vocal not performed by Ian Anderson on a studio album, in "Move on Alone". Mick Abrahams, the song's author, provided vocals; Dee Palmer provided the horn arrangement. Abrahams left Jethro Tull following the album's completion.

The song "Dharma for One", a staple of Tull's early concerts (usually incorporating an extended drum solo by Clive Bunker), was later covered by Ekseption, Pesky Gee! and The Ides of March. This song featured the "claghorn", a hybrid instrument invented by Jeffrey Hammond which combined the body of a recorder, the bell of a toy trumpet and the mouthpiece of a saxophone. Anderson also claims to have invented the instrument.

Reception

This Was received generally favourable reviews and sold well upon its release. Record Mirror thoroughly recommended the album in 1968 for being "full of excitement and emotion" and described the band as a blues ensemble "influenced by jazz music" capable of setting "the audience on fire". Allen Evans of New Musical Express wrote in his review that the album "sounds good and has a lot of humour about it" and that the band "play jazz really, in a soft, appealing way, and have a bit of fun on the side with tone patterns and singing". American critic Robert Christgau, on the contrary, was appalled by the success of a band that combined "the worst of Roland Kirk, Arthur Brown, and your nearest G.O. blues band."

Recent reviews of the remastered edition underline the duality of Anderson and Abrahams' songwriting and stage presence, as well as the strong ties of the band to blues in their early days. Sid Smith of BBC Music wrote that "what made Tull stand out from the great-coated crowd (of touring bands) was the high-visibility of frontman Ian Anderson's on-stage Tourette's-inspired hyper-gurning and Mick Abraham's ferocious fretwork." An AllMusic reviewer remarked how Jethro Tull on their vinyl debut appeared "vaguely reminiscent of the Graham Bond Organization only more cohesive, and with greater commercial sense". David Davies of Record Collector reminds how "This Was only hints at the depth and majesty of the ensuing seven albums", but also wrote that "the direct, unfussy and predominantly blues-based" tracks of the original recordings and the extra tracks of the collector's edition "could well come as something of a surprise" and "be of the greatest interest to Tull aficionados."

In the documentary film of the Woodstock Festival, portions of the songs "Beggar's Farm" and "Serenade to a Cuckoo" may be heard on the PA system, indicating the level of notice the album achieved in the United States. The album reached number 10 on the UK Albums Chart and number 62 on the US Billboard 200.

It was voted number 574 in Colin Larkin's All Time Top 1000 Albums.

Track listings

Standard edition

 1973 cassette version has same track order, but on opposite sides.
 Sides one and two were combined as tracks 1–10 on CD reissues.

 The 2001 remastered CD added three bonus tracks (which had been on the 20 Years of Jethro Tull box-set) and extensive liner notes.

 The 2018 edition CD added six bonus tracks (including four previously unreleased tracks).

40th anniversary collectors' edition (2008)
A deluxe, two-CD 40th anniversary edition was released in 2008. It contains the original mono version, a stereo version remixed from the original four-track session tapes, non-LP single tracks and the BBC sessions recorded by the band in 1968 for John Peel's "Top Gear".

The 50th Anniversary Edition consisted of 3 CDs as well as one DVD.

Personnel
Jethro Tull

 Ian Anderson – lead vocals (all except track 4), flute, mouth organ, claghorn, piano
 Mick Abrahams – lead vocals (track 4), co-lead vocals (track 2), backing vocals, electric guitar, nine-string guitar
 Glenn Cornick – bass guitar
 Clive Bunker – drums, percussion hooter, charm bracelet
Additional musicians
 Dee Palmer – French horn and orchestral arrangements

Production
 Terry Ellis – producer
 Victor Gamm – engineer

Charts

References

External links
 
 Jethro Tull - This Was (1968) album releases & credits at Discogs.com
 Jethro Tull - This Was (1968) album credits & user reviews at ProgArchives.com
 Jethro Tull - This Was (1968) album review by Ian (Storm) at SputnikMusic.com
 Jethro Tull - This Was (1968/2008 Remastered 40th Anniversary Collectors' Edition) album to be listened as stream at Play.Spotify.com
 Jethro Tull - This Was (1968/2001 Remastered Version) album to be listened as stream at Play.Spotify.com

Jethro Tull (band) albums
1968 debut albums
Island Records albums
Reprise Records albums
Chrysalis Records albums
Albums produced by Terry Ellis (record producer)